No.1 Fukurogura Dam is an earthfill dam located in Chiba Prefecture in Japan. The dam is used for irrigation and water supply. The catchment area of the dam is 0.6 km2. The dam impounds about 2  ha of land when full and can store 157 thousand cubic meters of water. The construction of the dam was completed in 1923.

References

Dams in Chiba Prefecture
1923 establishments in Japan